Anguina australis is a plant pathogenic nematode, who is a vector for Rathayibacter toxicus in Ehrharta longiflora.

References 

Agricultural pest nematodes
Tylenchida
Nematodes described in 1940